Al-Daylami or al-Dailami is a nisba indicating a Dailamite or a person from Daylam. It may refer to:

Fayruz al-Daylami, companion of the Islamic prophet Muhammad.
 Nafi Mawla Ibn Umar, Tabi'un scholar and narrator of Hadith
Muta of Daylam, king of Daylam
John of Dailam, 7th-century East Syriac Christian saint and monk
Al-Farra', 8/9th-century Kufan scholar
Imad al-Dawla Daylami, founder of the Buyid dynasty (r. 934–949)
'Adud al-Dawla Daylami, emir of the Buyid dynasty (r. 949–983)
Abu'l-Fath an-Nasir ad-Dailami, Zaidi imam in Yemen (r. 1038–1053)
Abu'l-Hasan Mihyar al-Daylami 11th-century Arabic-language poet
Abū Manṣūr al-Daylamī, 12th-century Islamic scholar and author of Musnad al-Firdous
Malek Deylami, 16th century scrivener and calligrapher
Kushyar Daylami

Nisbas